"Great Things" is the first single from Echobelly's second album On. It was released by the Britpop group in August 1995.

The song was included on both of the greatest hits albums that Echobelly have released; I Can't Imagine The World Without Me and The Best Of Echobelly. All B-sides to the single were re-released on the expanded edition of On.

A music video was made for the song.

It reached 13 in the UK Singles Chart, making it their highest charting single to date.

The song is about inspiration and aspiration, and how "everyone is hungry for something".

Track listing

UK & Europe CD1

UK & Europe CD2

Tracks 3 & 4 were recorded and released within 24 hours. The music label releasing this single wanted Echobelly to give them 2 b-sides, so Sonya & Glen quickly wrote and recorded both the tracks acoustically in a bathroom.

American promo CD

Tracks 2-5 were recorded live at Wetlands, New York City on 9 September 1995.

German promo cassette

Japanese promo CD

Tracks 1 & 2 appear on the a-side, tracks 3 & 4 appear on the b-side.

Credits
Bass – Alexander Keyser
Drums – Andy Henderson 
Guitar – Glenn Johansson, Debbie Smith
Voice – Sonya Madan
Lap Steel Guitar (on God's Guest List) - B.J. Cole
Engineer – Sean Slade
Producer - Paul Kolderie
Cover design - Stylorouge 
Cover photography - Ray Burmiston
Management - Ulterior Management

References

1995 singles
Echobelly songs
1995 songs
Epic Records singles